Great Marlow is a civil parish in Buckinghamshire, England.

Great Marlow may also refer to

Great Marlow, the official name of Marlow, Buckinghamshire, England until 1897
Great Marlow (UK Parliament constituency)
Great Marlow School, Marlow, Buckinghamshire